Julia Mangold (born 1966) is a German artist.

Her work is included in the collections of the Museum of Fine Arts Houston and the Museum of Modern Art, New York.

References

Living people
1966 births
20th-century German women artists
21st-century German women artists